Vigoroso da Siena was an Italian painter, known to be active 1270–1280. He was naturalized to Siena, Tuscany. A contemporary of Cimabue, his only documented work is a polyptych at the Galleria Nazionale of Perugia dated 1291.

References

Year of birth unknown
Year of death unknown
13th-century Italian painters
Italian male painters
Painters from Siena